Paul Preuning (fl. 1540–1550) was a German artist based in Nuremberg. The Preuning family of potters based in Nuremberg is recorded as making high class pottery at their workshop.  He is best known for his Hafner ware, which described jugs and other vessels made by stove makers. Preuning primarily decorated his pottery using the cloisonné technique, utilizing colored glazes kept apart by threads of clay.

References

16th-century births
16th-century deaths
German artists
German potters